Buckbrush is the common name for several species of North American shrubs that deer feed on, including but probably not limited to:
Cephalanthus occidentalis
Phyllanthopsis phyllanthoides, maidenbrush (south-central U.S.)
 Some western North American species of the genus Ceanothus, especially:
 Ceanothus cuneatus
 Purshia tridentata and P. stansburiana (dry regions of western North America)
 Symphoricarpos orbiculatus, native to the eastern United States and Canada